Route 102 or Highway 102 can refer to multiple roads:

China
  China National Highway 102

Canada
  New Brunswick Route 102
  Newfoundland and Labrador Route 102
  Nova Scotia Highway 102
  Ontario Highway 102
  Prince Edward Island Route 102
  Saskatchewan Highway 102

Costa Rica
 National Route 102

India
 National Highway 102 (India)

Ireland
 R102 road (Ireland)

Japan
 Japan National Route 102

Korea, South
 Namhae Expressway Branch 1

Philippines
 N102 highway (Philippines)

United Kingdom
  The A102 in London, England

United States
  U.S. Route 102 (former)
  Alabama State Route 102
  Arkansas Highway 102
  California State Route 102 (unconstructed)
 Colorado State Highway 102 (former)
  Connecticut Route 102
  Florida State Road 102
  County Road 102 (Levy County, Florida)
  Georgia State Route 102
  Illinois Route 102
  Indiana State Road 102 (former)
  Iowa Highway 102
  K-102 (Kansas highway)
  Kentucky Route 102
  Louisiana Highway 102
  Maine State Route 102
  Maryland Route 102 (former)
  Massachusetts Route 102
  M-102 (Michigan highway)
  Minnesota State Highway 102
 County Road 102 (Anoka County, Minnesota)
  County Road 102 (St. Louis County, Minnesota)
  Missouri Route 102
 Missouri Route 102 (1929) (former)
  Nebraska Highway 102 (former)
  New Hampshire Route 102
  County Route 102 (Bergen County, New Jersey)
  New Mexico State Road 102
  New York State Route 102
 County Route 102 (Albany County, New York)
 County Route 102 (Cayuga County, New York)
 County Route 102 (Cortland County, New York)
 County Route 102 (Montgomery County, New York)
 County Route 102 (Orleans County, New York)
 County Route 102 (Schenectady County, New York)
 County Route 102 (Seneca County, New York)
 County Route 102 (Suffolk County, New York)
 County Route 102 (Sullivan County, New York)
 County Route 102 (Tompkins County, New York)
 County Route 102 (Wayne County, New York)
  North Carolina Highway 102
  Ohio State Route 102 (former)
  Oklahoma State Highway 102
  Pennsylvania Route 102
  Rhode Island Route 102
  South Carolina Highway 102
  Tennessee State Route 102
  Texas State Highway 102
  Texas State Highway Spur 102
  Farm to Market Road 102
  Utah State Route 102
  Vermont Route 102
  Virginia State Route 102
  Virginia State Route 102 (1923-1928)
  Virginia State Route 102 (1928-1933)
  Virginia State Route 102 (1933-1951)
  Washington State Route 102
  West Virginia Route 102
  Wisconsin Highway 102

Territories
  Puerto Rico Highway 102

See also
 A102 road
 D102 road
 N102 (Bangladesh)
 R102 road (Ireland)
 R102 (South Africa)